Scaramucci may refer to:

 Scaramucci (surname), an Italian surname (including a list of people)

See also
Scaramouche (disambiguation)
 Scaramucce ,Rondò Venezian's third studio album 
 Scaramuccia (music ensemble), early music ensemble founded in 2013